Bergamask, bergomask, bergamesca, or bergamasca (from the town of Bergamo in Northern Italy), is a dance and associated melody and chord progression.

Reputation
It was considered a clumsy rustic dance (cf. Shakespeare, A Midsummer Night's Dream, Act V Scene i Lines 341 and 349) copied from the natives of Bergamo, reputed, according to the Encyclopædia Britannica Eleventh Edition, to be very awkward in their manners.

The dance is associated with clowns or buffoonery, as is the area of Bergamo, it having lent its dialect to the Italian buffoons.

Chord progression
The basic chord progression is I–IV–V–I:
│⎸   I   IV   V   I   I   IV   V   I     :⎹⎸
       I   IV   V   I   I   IV   V   I      ⎹│

Works
 

Seventeenth-century Italian composer Marco Uccellini adapted the Bergamasca as a lively instrumental piece titled "Aria sopra 'la bergamasca.'"

Twentieth-century Italian composer Ottorino Respighi adapted the melody as the final movement of his Suite #2 of Ancient Airs and Dances.

Bergomask is the title of the second of the Two Pieces for Piano (1925) by John Ireland (18791972).

The title of Claude Debussy's Suite bergamasque is a poetic reference and the piece is not related musically to the Bergamask described here.  Likewise, the "Masques et bergamasques" of twentieth-century French composer Gabriel Fauré is musically unrelated.

The characteristic I-IV-V-I progression features in popular music of the late 20th century, for example the song "Twist and Shout." Also of note, the 60's yéyé 'tube hit by then 20-year old France Gall's 'Sacré Charlemagne' and written by Roger Gall, her father, is straight from the Adriaan Smout's ( (1578-1646) ) Thysius Lute Book: it's a traditional Bergamasca dance for lute ensemble, which can be heard here: https://www.youtube.com/watch?v=GstMRyt_nnc at 47:46.

See also
Moresca
Romanesca
Masques et bergamasques
Suite bergamasque

Sources

Chord progressions
Italian dances
Renaissance dance
Clowning
European folk dances